Vanda tricolor is a species of orchid occurring in Laos and from Java, Bali, Lombok and Sumbawa. It was imported to England by Thomas Lobb, the collector for Veitch Nurseries, from the western part of Java in 1846.

References

External links

tricolor
Orchids of Bali
Orchids of Java
Orchids of Laos
Orchids of Vietnam
Plants described in 1847